Castelnau is a road in Barnes, in the London Borough of Richmond upon Thames, south west London, approximately  west from Charing Cross on the south side of the River Thames. It was originally named Upper Bridge Road. The name Castelnau is also used informally for Castelnau Estate and the area surrounding the road.

An area of Barnes including Castelnau was designated a conservation area in 1977.

Etymology
Castelnau takes its name from Castelnau-Valence, near Nîmes in France: in 1691, the 10th Baron of Castelnau and St Croix, a Huguenot, fled France for England following persecution,  and his son, Charles Boileau, settled in north Barnes and his descendants developed parts of the area. Maurice Boileau, the other son of the 10th Baron, stayed in the Castle and his descendants still live in the castle.

Castelnau means "new castle" in the Occitan language.

Pronunciation

History
Castelnau was developed after the opening of Hammersmith Bridge in 1827.

Major Charles Lestock Boileau built Castelnau Villas (now 84–122 and 91–125 Castelnau), designed by the architect William Laxton, in 1842, followed by rows of cottages called Castelnau Row, Castelnau Place and Gothic Cottages. After his death in 1889, Upper Bridge Road was renamed Castelnau.

Castelnau Estate

In 1926, London County Council built a cottage estate of 640 houses, called Castelnau Estate, on the site of a market garden. In 1971 these passed to ownership of Richmond upon Thames Council. Many are now privately owned. Many of the roads in this estate are named after Deans of St. Paul's who had been Lords of the manor of Barnes between the 14th and 17th centuries: Everdon, Kilmington, Alderbury, Kentwode, Howsman and Stillingfleet.

Notable buildings

Castelnau is noted for 20 pairs of exceptional classical villas which were built in 1842 by Major Boileau (see above). There are also two churches:
 Holy Trinity Barnes
 Catholic Church of St Osmund, Barnes

From around the time of World War II to 1987, the art dealership Abbott and Holder operated a gallery in the house at 73 Castelnau, which was also the home of the founder, Robert Abbott.

References

Areas of London
Barnes, London
Districts of London on the River Thames
Districts of the London Borough of Richmond upon Thames
Streets in the London Borough of Richmond upon Thames
Castelnau, London